Lesichovo Municipality is a municipality in the Pazardzhik Province of Bulgaria.

Demography

At the 2011 census, the population of Lesichovo was 5,408. Most of the inhabitants (75.53%%) were Bulgarians, and there were significant minorities of Gypsies/Romani (14.95%) and Turks (2.4%). 6.8% of the population's ethnicity was unknown.

Villages
 Borimechkovo
 Dinkata
 Kalugerovo
 Lesichovo (Capital)
 Pamidovo
 Starkovo
 Tserovo

References

Municipalities in Pazardzhik Province